Selishche is a rural locality (a village) in Gorod Vyazniki, Vyaznikovsky District, Vladimir Oblast, Russia. The population was 157 as of 2010.

Geography 
Selishche is located 10 km southeast of Vyazniki (the district's administrative centre) by road. Vyazniki is the nearest rural locality.

References 

Rural localities in Vyaznikovsky District